Love Now may refer to:
Love, Now, 2012–2013 Taiwanese television show
Love Now (film), 2007 South Korean film
"Love Now", song on English band Mott's 1975 album Drive On
"Love Now", song on Scottish DJ Calvin Harris' 2014 album Motion

See also
Love Now, Pay Later, 1959 West German drama film
Why Love Now, 2017 album by American band Pissed Jeans